Dawn Lindberg (14 April 1945 – 7 December 2020) was a South African folk singer, actress, theatre producer, director and founder of the South African Naledi Theatre Awards, but was more commonly known for her part in the musical folk group Des and Dawn with her husband Des Lindberg. Her career spanned almost six decades.

Early life
Dawn was born in Durban, South Africa in 1945 and was one of seven children. She would attend Parktown Girls High School in Johannesburg. As high school student, she was a AFS exchange student and was based in Detroit, Michigan in the United States, and would meet President John F. Kennedy on a trip to Washington, DC. After completing high school in 1961, she attended the University of the Witwatersrand where she studied for a Bachelor of Fine Arts.

Career
Des Lindberg taught her how to play the guitar while at university. He was already an accomplished folk singer and they would both perform at the Troubadour Club in Doornfontein singing compilations of protest songs by Bob Dylan and Joan Baez, some like We Shall Overcome which had been banned in South Africa. After marriage, they formed the theatre company, Cabaret and Theatre in 1965 and then spent three years travelling South Africa and Rhodesia in a caravan performing their music at informal venues to sold-out audiences. Their first album, released in 1967, Folk On Trek, would be banned in South Africa because of what censors called obscene lyrics and the copies of the record destroyed. The Seagull's Name Was Nelson was released by the duo in 1971 and spent 20 weeks on the South African charts, a subtle song about Nelson Mandela. Other subtle protest songs included This Land is your Land in 1976.

They moved into theatre production in 1973 when they produced the musical Godspell at the Holiday Inn, Maseru, Lesotho for five months. Bringing the production to South Africa was more difficult and when it ran at the University of the Witwatersrand it was banned for blasphemy. Hiring Anton Mostert, he fought their case in the supreme court and won, allowing the musical to tour the country for eighteen months.

In 1976, they produced The Black Mikado, a West End musical, in Diepkloof, Soweto with white patrons subject to unnecessary police searches on entering the township. It would eventually tour the country and at one venue, all the patrons' car tires were slashed, while the duo themselves were subjected to death threats. Theatres in South Africa would eventually open to all races in 1978.

When The Best Little Whorehouse in Texas was produced, the censors banned the word "whore" in the posters and publicity material but were again overturned in court when lawyer Jules Browde successfully argued about the confusion patrons might have with the title, The Best Little House in Texas, if they did not understand what they were coming to see.

She and Des would go on to produce ten musicals and ten plays including Pop Corn, King Afrika, The Shrew, Gloo Joo, Lennon and the Vagina Monologues.

Continuing their musical protests, at their mansion home on Houghton Ridge, Sunday soirees were conducted over the years defying a law that prohibited public entertainment on Sundays in South Africa. South African artists including Johnny Clegg, Sipho Mchunu, John Kani, Winston Ntshona, Oswald Mtshali, Abigail Kubeka, the Soweto String Quartet, Hugh Masekela, Jonas Gwangwa, and the Drakensberg Boys Choir were only some of the performers.

In 2004 Dawn conceived the idea of a theatre award to replace the Vita Awards which had ended due to lack of sponsorship and so created the Naledi Theatre Awards funded by herself and by begging for sponsorship. Internationally recognised, the award show would eventually feature on SABC television and later the cable channel KykNet.

Marriage
She met her future husband Des Lindberg at the university in 1962 where he was studying law. They would later marry in 1965.

Death
Dawn died at a Plettenberg Bay hospital on 7 December 2020, from COVID-19 during the COVID-19 pandemic in South Africa after announcing by video message six days earlier that she had contracted the virus. She is survived by her husband Des, children Joshua, Adam and grandchildren Saria and Shia.

Honours
In 2015, Minister of Arts and Culture, Nathi Mthethwa named the duo as designated Living Legends.

Discography

Albums

Singles

Compilations

Filmography
 Oh Brother..! (1974)
 The Men from the Ministry (1971)

External links
 Top Tracks – Des & Dawn - YouTube

References

1945 births
2020 deaths
South African folk musicians
20th-century South African women singers
Deaths from the COVID-19 pandemic in South Africa
University of the Witwatersrand alumni
South African expatriates in the United States
White South African people